Blood and Thunder is a professional wrestling supercard event produced by Major League Wrestling (MLW). The event was first held in 2019 as a television taping for MLW's weekly program, Fusion.

Dates and venues

References

Blood and Thunder